Aaron Davidovich Katz (1901 – 1971) was a major general in the Red Army and a member of the Jewish Anti-Fascist Committee (JAC).

Born in the town (shtetl) of Ryasny in Mogilev Governorate (present-day Belarus), he joined the army in 1919 and later graduated from a military academy.

From 1942, during the Second World War, he led the Red Army agency responsible for the draft and for the formation of army divisions. Because of the enormous losses suffered by the army, this position was of great importance. However, his service did not prevent his discharge from the army in 1947 and subsequent arrest in 1948 as a member of the JAC. He survived beatings and was released from jail upon Joseph Stalin's death in 1953. He died in Moscow in 1971.

1901 births
1971 deaths
People from Drybin District
People from Chaussky Uyezd
Belarusian Jews
Soviet Jews in the military
Soviet major generals
Jewish anti-fascists